Pararrhaptica longiplicata is a moth of the family Tortricidae. It was first described by Lord Walsingham in 1907. It is endemic to the Hawaiian islands of Kauai, Oahu, Maui, Lanai and Hawaii.

The larvae feed on Myrsine species.

External links

Archipini
Endemic moths of Hawaii